Pudsey Park is a public park in Pudsey, West Yorkshire, England, approximately  west of Leeds city centre. The park is the second most popular in Leeds after Roundhay Park.

Facilities include a children's playground, a skate park, bowling green and a café.

The park did have a visitor centre, which hosted local wildlife displays. This centre has now closed, as from April 2021 due to council funding cuts. 

A road roller vehicle was gifted to the park in 1959 after it was no longer required by the West Riding County Council. It was used by children to play on until it was removed in 1990 due to fears of asbestos flaking off the vehicle. A campaign is underway to restore the road roller to working condition.

References

External links
Aerial imagery of the park from 1928

Parks and commons in Leeds